Andrzej Jerzy Żurawski (born 6 September 1940) is a Polish former ice hockey player. He played for Pomorzanin Toruń during his career. He also played for the Polish national team at the 1964 Winter Olympics and the 1986 and four World Championships.

References

External links
 

1940 births
Living people
Ice hockey players at the 1964 Winter Olympics
Olympic ice hockey players of Poland
Polish ice hockey forwards
Sportspeople from Toruń
TKH Toruń players